Clarence "Foots" Walker (born May 21, 1951 in Southampton, New York) is a former professional basketball player.

A 6' 0" guard, he led the Vincennes Trailblazers to their second NJCAA National Title (1970) alongside Bob McAdoo; after transferring to the West Georgia College, he led Roger Kaiser's Braves to the 1974 NAIA National Title.
Walker spent ten seasons (1974–1984) in the NBA, playing for the Cleveland Cavaliers and the New Jersey Nets. On October 17, 1978, Walker set a career high with 26 points scored in a win against the Los Angeles Lakers. He was the first Cavalier to record a triple-double, which he achieved in 1979.

In 1980, Walker was partying with former-teammate Terry Furlow shortly before Furlow died after crashing into a utility pole while under the influence of cocaine and valium.

Walker was inducted into the Suffolk Sports Hall of Fame in the Basketball Category with the Class of 1991, and currently resides in Kansas City, Missouri.

References

External links
NBA career stats

1951 births
Living people
African-American basketball players
American men's basketball players
Basketball players from New York (state)
Cleveland Cavaliers draft picks
Cleveland Cavaliers players
New Jersey Nets players
People from Southampton (town), New York
Point guards
Vincennes Trailblazers men's basketball players
West Georgia Wolves men's basketball players
21st-century African-American people
20th-century African-American sportspeople